This is list of operas and operettas written by the French composer Léo Delibes (1836–1891).

References
 Macdonald, Hugh (1992), "Delibes, Léo" in The New Grove Dictionary of Opera, ed. Stanley Sadie (London) 
 
Some of the information in this article is taken from the Dutch Wikipedia article.

 
Lists of operas by composer
Lists of compositions by composer